Squamomedina is a genus of parasitic flies in the family Tachinidae.

Species
Squamomedina squamata Townsend, 1934

Distribution
Brazil.

References

Diptera of South America
Endemic fauna of Brazil
Dexiinae
Tachinidae genera
Taxa named by Charles Henry Tyler Townsend
Monotypic Brachycera genera